Jason Akeson (born June 3, 1990) is a Canadian professional ice hockey right winger for Straubing Tigers of the Deutsche Eishockey Liga (DEL). He played 15 games in the National Hockey League (NHL) with the Philadelphia Flyers between 2013 and 2015.

Playing career
As a youth, Akeson played in the 2003 Quebec International Pee-Wee Hockey Tournament with a minor ice hockey team from Cumberland, Ontario.

Junior
Akeson played junior hockey for the Cumberland Grads of the CJHL from 2006-08. He had a total of 114 points in 88 games for them. In 2007-08 Akeson played 13 games for the Kitchener Rangers of the Ontario Hockey League. He had a total of 2 points (assists). Akeson returned to the Rangers in 2008-09 to play in his first full OHL season. Although the Rangers finished last in the Central Division, Akeson still had a successful season scoring 64 points in 56 games. He was named to the league's Second All-Rookie team.

In the 2009–10 season Akeson had 80 points while playing on a line with Jeff Skinner and Jeremy Morin in 56 regular season games. He scored an additional 19 points in 20 playoff games. In 2010-11 Akeson tied for first overall in points with Tyler Toffoli with 108 points. He was first overall in the league in assists, with 84. Akeson was named the league's Most Gentlemanly Player, recording only 23 penalty minutes. He was also awarded the OHL's Leo Lalonde Memorial Trophy as the league's top over age player.

Professional
Akeson was signed by the Philadelphia Flyers to a three-year entry-level contract on March 2, 2011. He spent most of his first two professional seasons with the Adirondack Phantoms of the American Hockey League, leading the team in point scoring both seasons. He made his NHL debut on April 27, 2013 in the Flyers season finale against the Ottawa Senators (of the rookie's hometown) in which he also banked his first NHL goal on netminder Craig Anderson, which was also his first NHL career shot. He spent the 2013–14 regular season with Adirondack, but was called up for the Flyers' final regular season game. He was then added to the postseason roster, where he netted two goals in a seven-game first round loss to the New York Rangers.

On July 1, 2015, Akeson signed a one-year, two-way contract with the Buffalo Sabres. He began the 2015–16 season with affiliate, the Rochester Americans. After 52 games with the Americans, he was traded by the Sabres in a seven player deal to the Ottawa Senators on February 27, 2016. He was immediately reassigned to AHL affiliate, the Binghamton Senators for the remainders of the year.

As a free agent from the Senators, Akeson opted to continue his career abroad, agreeing to a one-year deal with Russian club, Admiral Vladivostok on September 20, 2016. After 17 games with Vladivostok, Akeson left Admiral and returned to the Binghamton Senators for the rest of the 2016–17 season.

Akeson was un-signed over the summer and belatedly agreed to a professional try-out contract to join the Syracuse Crunch training camp on September 26, 2017. He made the opening night roster for the 2017–18 season, and despite contributing with 1 goal and 5 points he was released by the Crunch after 11 games on November 9, 2017. Akeson as a free agent opted to sign abroad for the remainder of the season, signing with Swedish club, Mora IK of the SHL on December 19, 2017.

In the following off-season, Akeson decided to continue his European career, agreeing to a one-year deal with German club, Kölner Haie of the DEL, on July 25, 2018. He spent three seasons with Kölner Haie before joining the Straubing Tigers on July 1, 2021. He finished his first season with the Tigers as the top scorer in the league, with 68 points.

Career statistics

Awards and honours

References

External links
 

1990 births
Adirondack Phantoms players
Admiral Vladivostok players
Binghamton Senators players
Canadian ice hockey right wingers
Ice hockey people from Ottawa
Kitchener Rangers players
Kölner Haie players
Lehigh Valley Phantoms players
Living people
Mora IK players
Philadelphia Flyers players
Rochester Americans players
Straubing Tigers players
Syracuse Crunch players
Trenton Titans players
Undrafted National Hockey League players
Canadian expatriate ice hockey players in Germany
Canadian expatriate ice hockey players in Russia
Canadian expatriate ice hockey players in Sweden